Ari Gold (February 11, 1974 – February 14, 2021) was an American pop singer and songwriter. He was openly gay, and regularly addressed being both Jewish and gay. He starred in an autobiographical theater production Ari Gold– Untitled: The Making of a Gay Pop Star.

Early life
Gold was born and raised in the Bronx, New York City, in an Orthodox Jewish family. He was discovered while singing at his brother Steven's bar mitzvah at the age of five.

He was awarded top prize alongside Steven and his other brother, future comedian Elon, at the First Annual Jewish Children's Song Festival. Gold landed his first job as a professional singer and actor by performing the lead role on the CBS Children's recording Pot Belly Bear: Song and Stories. The album went platinum, and led to his successful career as a child vocalist. He sang over 400 jingles, and provided various voices for Cabbage Patch Kids and cult favorite Jem. He also provided vocals for the song "A Father Should Be..." by Starlight Girl Ba Nee, which appeared in the episodes The Jem Jam Part 1, and the final episode A Father Should Be.... He also performed back-up vocals for Diana Ross and Cyndi Lauper.

After graduating from the Ramaz School in Manhattan, Gold studied at Yale University. He then transferred to New York University, where he would receive his Bachelor of Arts.

Musical career

1996–2002
Gold began performing original music at Joe's Pub, Fez, China Club, Barracuda, Metronome, Avalon, Pyramid Club, Splash, Bar d'O, Starlight, and CBGB's. He recorded the material for his self-titled 2001 debut album, Ari Gold, in which Gold uses male pronouns, and shows men being affectionate with one another in his music videos. The album won gold at the 2002 Outmusic Award for Outstanding Debut Recording. Later that year, Gold was named one of Genre Magazine's "Men We Love".

His debut also caught the attention of songwriter Desmond Child. Their first collaboration "I'm All About You" (Island Universal) was on the Top 20 UK singles charts, and a Top 10 dance hit. The song was co-written and produced with UK garage musicians DJ Luck & MC Neat.

2003–2005: Space Under Sun
In 2003, Grammy award-winning producer David Morales remixed "I'll Be Here", which Ari co-wrote with Automagic for Nashom of The Ones ("Flawless") solo project. The song became a Top-10 Billboard dance hit, and was featured on Queer As Folk. In 2003, Gold began recording his second album. In January 2004, Gold's second album Space Under Sun was released on his label GOLD18 Records. It debuted at No. 1 on the Out-voice Charts. The Advocate wrote that his "equal parts of sly, finger-snappin' sass and earthy R&B finesse," created the "crisp...sound of a platinum-selling recording." 

The video single "Wave of You" debuted as a DVD extra, and became a mainstay during the launch of Logo TV, included in its list for the best videos of 2005. MetroSource magazine also named Ari "One of the 25 People That Make Us Proud". Gold's appearance in the VH1 special My Coolest Years: In the Closet solidified Gold's status as an emerging gay icon. In 2005, Space Under Sun took home the Out music Award for Outstanding New Recording.

On the Space Under Sun World Tour, Gold opened for RuPaul and Chaka Khan, and headlined clubs and festivals in Europe (France, Italy, Switzerland, Belgium, and Czech Republic). He also toured Canada, and in over 25 cities across the US, including the world's largest stage at the Reno Hilton.

2005: The Remixes
In September 2005, Gold released his first remix album, The Remixes. The album was named the No. 2 Best Independent Release of 2005, according to national magazine The Advocate. The first single, "Love Will Take Over" became a Billboard Dance Chart hit. The "Love Will Take Over" video has been played on HBO Zone, Rock America, and For Promo Only, and claimed the top spot for two weeks in a row on MTV's Logo. In December 2005, Gold released Ari Gold: The Photo-book.

2006–2008: Transport Systems
In 2006, Gold began recording his album in Los Angeles and New York City where he began working with Steve Skinner and Grammy Award-winning producer Joe Hogue on the album. In 2007, Gold released his third studio album, Transport Systems. Gold debuted on the Billboard Top 10 charts for the first time, six months after winning the prestigious 13th Annual USA Songwriting Competition for "Where The Music Takes You", where he won the Overall Grand Prize. The album features special guests Adam Joseph, Mr. Man, Sasha Allen and Dave Koz. LGBT-focused magazine Pink wrote his lyrics lingered on "gender, sexuality, addiction and race." In early 2008, the song "Love Wasn't Built in a Day" won in The 7th Annual Independent Music Awards for Best R&B Song.

2010–2013: Between the Spirit and the Flesh
In 2010, Gold returned to the studio to begin the recording sessions for his fourth studio album. In October 2010, Gold released the lead single "Make My Body Rock". In May 2011, Gold released his fourth album Between the Spirit & the Flesh under the name Sir Ari. In mid-2011, Gold released the second single "Sparkle". In February 2012, Gold released "My Favorite Religion" as the third single.

In 2013, Gold released his second remix album Play My F**k Remix.

2015–2021: Soundtrack to Freedom
In July 2015, Gold released his single "Sex Like a Pornstar". In August 2015, Gold released his fifth studio album, Soundtrack to Freedom, under the name GoldNation.

Other ventures

Songwriting
Gold has written songs for #1 Billboard dance recording artist Kevin Aviance on both his debut Box of Chocolates and the Tony Moran-produced Entity. He also worked with Diane Warren and Stephen Bray on 1980s teenscream Tommy Page's last album, Ten til Midnight, in which Page covered Gold's first written song, Dance To the Beat of My Heart. Gold's music has been licensed to numerous independent films, including Boy Culture, Shortbus, and Latin Boys Go to Hell, for which he served as the music supervisor, and appeared in the film performing his song "See Through Me". He also served as music supervisor on the documentary Fabulous! The Story of Queer Cinema.

Modeling career
Gold appeared in fashion magazines such as W and VIBE, for which he was photographed by Walter Chin, and chosen as one of the Stylistics in the January 2002 issue. He was named one of "The 9 Hottest Men in NYC" by H/X magazine, and one of the Hottest Men in the World by DNA magazine. After interviewing and photographing Gold for AXM magazine, Boy George chose him to be the spokesmodel for his clothing line RUDE.

Illness and death
Gold died from leukemia on February 14, 2021, three days after his 47th birthday. RuPaul, whom Gold had described as a mentor, was among those to express condolences on social media.

Discography
Albums
 2001: Ari Gold
 2004: Space Under Sun
 2005: The Remixes
 2007: Transport Systems
 2011: Between the Spirit & the Flesh
 2013: Play My F**kn Remix
 2015: Soundtrack to Freedom

Singles
 2001: See Through Me
 2004: Wave of You
 2004: He's on My Team (featuring Kendra Ross)
 2005: Love Will Take Over (JKriv's Love Lounge Radio Mix)
 2007: Where the Music Takes You (featuring Sasha Allen)
 2007: Love Wasn't Built in a Day (featuring Dave Koz)
 2008: Human (featuring Mr. Man)
 2009: I Can Forgive You
 2010: Mr. Mistress
 2010: Make My Body Rock
 2011: Sparkle (featuring Sarah Dash)
 2012: My Favourite Religion
 2013: Play My F**Z Record
 2013: Love Goddess (Remix)
 2015: Sex Like a Pornstar
 2016: Turn Out the Night
 2017: Make Music

Filmography

Awards and nominations

References

External links
 
 
 

1974 births
2021 deaths
21st-century American singers
21st-century American male singers
American Orthodox Jews
American contemporary R&B singers
American male pop singers
Place of death missing
American male singer-songwriters
Deaths from leukemia
Gay singers
Gay songwriters
American gay musicians
Independent Music Awards winners
Jewish American musicians
Jewish singers
LGBT Orthodox Jews
Gay Jews
American LGBT singers
American LGBT songwriters
Musicians from the Bronx
Ramaz School alumni
20th-century LGBT people
21st-century LGBT people
21st-century American Jews
Singer-songwriters from New York (state)
American gay writers